In the early morning hours of 20 April 1998, in Marina South, Central, Singapore, a 23-year-old Malaysian named Jonaris Badlishah, who was the nephew of the Sultan of Kedah, brutally murdered 42-year-old beautician Sally Poh Bee Eng in order to rob her of her Rolex watch, which he wanted to give to his girlfriend as a birthday present. He was said to have used a hammer to hit her on the head more than ten times before robbing her, leading to Poh to die from her skull fractures. Following police investigations, Jonaris was arrested three days later and charged with murder.

In his trial, Jonaris pled the murder charge with a defence of diminished responsibility, claiming that he was depressed, intoxicated with drugs and heard voices telling him to kill the victim. The psychiatric experts from the prosecution, however, assessed him and found him to be normal and not suffering from any abnormality of the mind when he killed Poh. Hence, Jonaris was found guilty of murder and sentenced to death in December 1998, and he was hanged in 1999 after losing his appeal.

Murder investigation

On 20 April 1998, in a forest nearby Marina South bus stop, a passer-by discovered the corpse of a woman among the vegetation, and female's belongings were found at the bus stop. The victim was later identified as 42-year-old Sally Poh Bee Eng (alternative Chinese name ), who was a beautician and make-up artist for low budget films. At the time of her death, Poh was married to a 47-year-old teacher Lee Boon Siang , and have two grown-up children - a son and daughter. The police found that some of her valuables were missing, including a Rolex watch, which was bought by her husband three years prior to her murder.

According to Poh's husband, he overheard that his wife speaking on the telephone the day before the murder, speaking to a man about an early morning appointment. Lee said that the man's name was "Lai Joe", from what he heard. Using the name, police later investigated and discovered there was a 23-year-old man who happened to have a nickname called "Liar Joe", which sounds similar to "Lai Joe".

"Liar Joe", whose real name was Jonaris Badlishah, was arrested as a suspect three days after the murder. On the day of the murder, he had given his 31-year-old girlfriend, Saifon Ngammoo, a Rolex watch as a birthday present, and was later confirmed to be the missing watch that Poh wore before her death. Jonaris, whose full name was actually Tengku Jonaris Badlishah bin Tengku Abdul Hamid Thani due to him being the nephew of the then Sultan of Kedah (which made him also known as "Tengku Jonaris Badlishah" in both Singaporean and Malaysian newspapers), was charged with murder.

Trial
On 28 October 1998, Jonaris, then 23 years old, stood trial in the High Court of Singapore for the robbery and murder of Poh. He was defended by lawyer Peter Fernando and Deputy Public Prosecutor (DPP) Jasbendar Kaur of the Attorney-General's Chambers led the prosecution. Jonaris was often dressed smartly in his court appearances, and his case was highly publicized given his status as a prince and the nature of his crime.

Prosecution's case

Professor Chao Tzee Cheng, the forensic pathologist who conducted an autopsy on Poh, testified that he found extensive fractures on the left side of Poh's skull. The longest crack on her head measured about 13cm long. He said that these fractures were fatal that even if she had received medical help at the scene, doctors would not have been able to revive her. He said that these fractures could be inflicted by a blunt instrument and from behind, taking the victim by surprise. Professor Chao said he found slash wounds on the wrists of Poh, which might be inflicted to ensure that Poh would die even if the skull fractures did not kill her; in fact, she was already dead by the time her wrists were cut.

The prosecution, in their case, presented that Jonaris had in fact premeditated the murder and wanted to kill Poh to rob her of her Rolex watch in order to give it as a birthday present to Saifon. It was revealed in court that Jonaris first met Poh on 18 April 1998, and having seen her wearing a Rolex watch, he decided to rob her, and thus on 19 April, the day before the killing, Jonaris telephoned Poh and arranged to meet her early in the morning the next day for a photoshoot, requiring her services. In the phone call, Jonaris introduced himself as "Nigel", which Poh and Lee misheard as "Lai Joe" (which ironically, and indirectly linked him to his "Liar Joe" nickname and led to his capture).

On the day of the murder, at around 6.30 am, Poh arrived at the Marina South bus stop, opposite the Superbowl Golf and Country Club, and she met Jonaris, who told her that "Nigel" and the crew would be arriving later in a short time. After parking her car, both Poh and Jonaris waited at the bus stop; it was there when Jonaris took out a hammer and struck the woman on the head, before he dragged her unconscious body to the bushes behind the bus stop and moved about 10 metres (yards) away from the area. At that point, Poh regained consciousness and tried to stand up. Jonaris then reignited his attack and he inflicted more than ten hammer blows on the back of her head until she blacked out again. He took away her watch and also slashed her wrists before he fled the scene. For this, the prosecution argued that Jonaris was able to carefully draft out a plan to murder Poh and used a fake name in order to meticulously carry out the crime.

Saifon Ngammoo, the Thai prostitute whom Jonaris first met in October 1997, testified that she told her boyfriend about a Rolex watch she used to own and gifted to her by her ex-husband, and the watch was later pawned in 1995 to help a friend. She reportedly told Jonaris that she missed the watch as she cherished it for its special value to her. She also told the court that on the day of her birthday (which fell on the same day of Poh's murder), Jonaris bought a bouquet of red roses, a cake and a bottle of whiskey and brought them to her workplace - a brothel at Lorong 18 in Geylang. He also gave her a Rolex watch at the birthday party where a few other girls were present, and she noticed that it was not new. She said she asked Jonaris but he was angry in response, to which she told him she was joking and thanked him, without knowing that he robbed the watch from Poh before killing her at Marina South.

Jonaris's defence
Jonaris's main defence was diminished responsibility. He said he suffered from depression, cannabis intoxication and obsession of the Rolex watch.

Jonaris said that he was depressed before he killed Poh. His financial troubles did not go away from him despite his royalty status, and he owed money to his mother and friends. He sought solace and fell in love with Saifon given that they both have troubled pasts, and he felt she can understand him. Jonaris said that somehow, after hearing Saifon's story about the watch, he grew obsessed with the Rolex watch and it appeared in his dream at times. He felt like possessing the watch after seeing Sally Poh wearing it, and Jonaris said he only paid attention to it despite seeing the other valuables of Poh. On the day he met up with Poh at Marina South, Jonaris claimed that a voice in his mind told him to rob the woman of her watch. He said he was unable to control himself when his hand unknowingly took the hammer to bash at Poh's head, and could only see her mouth moving but no sound came out given. As he walked away from the scene after taking her watch, he said he felt a kind of “happiness and relief” that he had never experienced:

The colour of the water, the sky, the bird, was so new. I felt so free, like a renaissance, like a new beginning. Everything seemed so clean. It looked like a beautiful day.

Jonaris said that after robbing Poh of her Rolex watch, he went home to take a nap, and when he woke up, he thought he had had a nightmare of killing a person. Then it only dawned on him that everything was real when he found Poh's Rolex watch in his drawer.

Jonaris also revealed his painful childhood while on the stand. He said that when he was young, his Singaporean mother Elizabeth Seet divorced his father, Tengku Abdul Hamid Thani (who was the brother of the Sultan of Kedah), before she remarried with Robert Seah. He recounted that he and his younger brother were abused by his stepfather and mother, who often physically abused them and considered them "outsiders" while treating their own two children well with love. The couple used to force Jonaris to kneel for hours and clipped clothes pegs on his ears, fingers, lip and tongue. He would be made to chew raw chilli and stand in front of a mirror for hours, and often got caned and hit by a belt. He also claimed that his mother told him to say he was her nephew and not her son in public. The child abuse suffered by Jonaris was confirmed by his mother who took the stand and gave her testimony, and Seet said that her second husband Seah disliked her sons from the previous marriage and asked her to consider them as her nephews rather than her children. When asked by the trial judge if she considered her son fit enough to be punished, Seet replied yes.

Dr Chan Khim Yew, who was the prosecution's psychiatrist, assessed Jonaris and found that he was not suffering from depression or any abnormality of the mind. He said that Jonaris was able to clearly describe how he murdered Poh, and his emotions before and during the time he murdered Poh, as well as able to feel fear that Poh might report him to the police. Besides, Jonaris was still able to enjoy the company of his girlfriend and acquaintances and mixed well with people around him, as well as enjoying sex with Saifon and working hard in his jobs up till the day of the Rolex watch murder; these signs of behaviour, according to Dr Chan, did not fit the description of those suffering from depression. His supposed compulsion and obsession with the watch were not signs of a mental illness and it did not mean that one who was abused as a child would suffer from any mental disorders. Many of his colleagues and friends noted that Jonaris was his usual self at the time he executed the murder plot.

On 2 December 1998, judgement was reserved and the verdict was scheduled to be given on 8 December 1998.

Death sentence

On 8 December 1998, after a 19-day trial, Judicial Commissioner Amarjeet Singh released his final verdict, ruling that Jonaris was not suffering from diminished responsibility when he murdered Poh. He judged that Jonaris was normal, and was able to work hard, mingle with his friends and fall in love with Saifon Ngammoo, which was not a symptom of any depressed mood or mental illnesses nearing or on the day of the murder. He noted that Jonaris's financial debts incurred at the time he met his girlfriend, and his job as a prop assistant only allowed him to earn a monthly salary of $2,000 but he often splurge $4,000 every month on his weekly four visits to his girlfriend at the brothel.

JC Singh also stated that Jonaris often boasted about his royal bloodline, wealth and lifestyle while he lived in the house of his mother and step-father, and out of desperation to back up his lies, Jonaris committed the robbery for money. He added that when Sally Poh regained consciousness and tried to crawl away, Jonaris continually attacked her with cold blood by hitting her on the head until her skull broke into pieces. He even slashed her wrists with a paper cutter to allow her to bleed to death to not allow her to escape alive to report him. It would only mean that Jonaris was fully in control of himself at the time, and was able to act quickly and have quick-thinking. Hence he should face the full responsibility and punishment for his cruel and inhumane conduct for depriving Poh of her possessions and right to live in order to satisfy his own greed.

For the murder of Sally Poh, 23-year-old Jonaris Badlishah was sentenced to death. According to reports, while Jonaris was led away from the court, Poh's widowed husband Lee Boon Siang, who was present at the courtroom to hear the verdict, was satisfied with the death sentence verdict and angrily shouted at Jonaris, "You deserve it!"

On 24 February 1999, Jonaris lost his appeal against the death sentence, and he was eventually hanged.

Aftermath
After Jonaris's trial and execution, Saifon Ngammoo returned to Thailand and settled in her hometown in Thailand, where she built a house there with her Nepalese husband.

The murder took on the same day of Columbine High School massacre, but one year earlier.

The Rolex watch murder was considered a notable crime that shook Singapore. In July 2015, Singapore's national daily newspaper The Straits Times published a e-book titled Guilty As Charged: 25 Crimes That Have Shaken Singapore Since 1965, which included the 1998 Rolex murder as one of the top 25 crimes that shocked the nation since its independence in 1965. The book was borne out of collaboration between the Singapore Police Force and the newspaper itself. The e-book was edited by ST News Associate editor Abdul Hafiz bin Abdul Samad. The paperback edition of the book was published and first hit bookshelves in June 2017. The paperback edition first entered the ST bestseller list on 8 August 2017, a month after publication.

The case was one of forensic pathologist Chao Tzee Cheng's famous cases; this was also his last reported major case, as Professor Chao died in New York in 2000, two years after the Rolex watch murder and one year after Jonaris was executed. The case was re-enacted in the 2014 crime show Whispers of the Dead, and it aired as the seventh episode of the show's second season. Details like Jonaris's name (it was changed to Ismail Radin) were changed for dramatic purposes, but overall, the way Jonaris murdered Poh and his defence in trial was faithful to the real-life details.

See also
 Capital punishment in Singapore
 List of major crimes in Singapore (2000–present)
 List of major crimes in Singapore (before 2000)
 Columbine High School massacre, which would coincidentally occur next year on the same day.
 Dunblane massacre

References

Murder in Singapore
People murdered in Singapore
1998 murders in Singapore
Capital punishment in Singapore
Rolex
Violence against women in Singapore